Eunoe tuerkayi is a scale worm described from the Mediterranean Sea at depths of about 30m.

Description
Number of segments 40; elytra 15 pairs. Prostomium anterior margin comprising a pair of acute anterior projections. Lateral antennae inserted ventrally (beneath prostomium and median antenna). Elytra marginal fringe of papillae present. Notochaetae distinctly thicker than neurochaetae. Bidentate neurochaetae absent.

References

Phyllodocida
Animals described in 2003